St. Vincent de Paul Catholic Church, now known as Prince of Peace Catholic Church, is a historic Catholic church in Mobile, Alabama. It was designed by a local architect, James H. Hutchisson, in the Gothic Revival style. 

The current building was built in 1874 and dedicated on January 21, 1877. It replaced an earlier frame structure that had been completed in 1847 and burned prior to the erection of this building. This building was originally the parish church for Saint Vincent de Paul Parish.  

The neighboring Black parish, St. Peter Claver, was established in 1911. On December 25, 1970 these two parishes were combined to form Prince of Peace. A new St. Vincent de Paul Parish was then established in western Mobile County to serve the Tillmans Corner area. 

The original church was placed on the National Register of Historic Places on April 24, 1992, as a part of the Historic Roman Catholic Properties in Mobile Multiple Property Submission.

References

National Register of Historic Places in Mobile, Alabama
Churches on the National Register of Historic Places in Alabama
Gothic Revival church buildings in Alabama
Roman Catholic churches in Mobile, Alabama
Roman Catholic Archdiocese of Mobile
Roman Catholic churches in Alabama
Roman Catholic churches completed in 1874
1847 establishments in Alabama
19th-century Roman Catholic church buildings in the United States
African-American Roman Catholic churches